Lars Uebel (born 14 October 1980) is a retired German tennis player and coach.

Uebel has a career high ATP singles ranking of 242 achieved on 20 March 2006. He also has a career high ATP doubles ranking of 168 achieved on 9 January 2006.

Uebel made his ATP main draw debut at the 2005 Ordina Open in the singles draw facing Guillermo Coria.

References

External links

Lars Uebel at the Association of Tennis Professionals Coach profile

1980 births
Living people
German male tennis players
Tennis players from Berlin
German tennis coaches